Danzig is an American heavy metal band from Lodi, New Jersey. Formed in 1987, the group evolved from Samhain and originally included eponymous vocalist and keyboardist Glenn Danzig, guitarist John Christ, bassist Eerie Von and drummer Chuck Biscuits. The band's current lineup includes Danzig, drummer Johnny Kelly (from 2002 to 2003, and since 2005), guitarist Tommy Victor (from 1996 to 1997, 2003 to 2005, and since 2008), and touring bassist Steve Zing (since 2006).

History

1987–2000
Danzig evolved from Samhain and originally included eponymous vocalist and keyboardist Glenn Danzig (real name Glenn Anzalone), guitarist John Christ (real name John Knoll), bassist Eerie Von (real name Eric Stellmann) and drummer Chuck Biscuits (real name Charles Montgomery). After recording four studio albums, Biscuits left Danzig in the summer of 1994 following a contractual dispute with the frontman. He was replaced by former Sugartooth drummer Joey Castillo, after Dave Grohl turned down an offer to join. Christ and Von also left the following year, announcing their departure from the band in July 1995 due to a "breakdown in communication", said to stem from "the monopoly Glenn Danzig [had] on songwriting".

After a brief hiatus, Danzig returned in 1996 with guitarist Mark Chaussee and bassist Josh "Lazie" Resnik (Castillo's cousin and drum technician), although the former left just three months later and was replaced by Prong frontman Tommy Victor. Both new members left in early 1997, after the conclusion of the touring cycle for Danzig 5: Blackacidevil. In September they were replaced by guitarist Dave Kushner and bassist Rob "Blasko" Nicholson. After one show on October 31, Kushner left the band and was later replaced by Jeff Chambers. Resnik also returned to the group later to take over from Nicholson, who left to join Rob Zombie's band. In the summer of 1999, Chambers was replaced by Todd Youth (real name Todd Schofield), after the former had recorded for the upcoming album Danzig 6:66 Satan's Child.

2000 onwards
Resnik left Danzig for a second time in April 2000, with former D Generation bassist Howie Pyro (real name Howard Kusten) taking his place. The lineup of Danzig, Youth, Pyro and Castillo released Live on the Black Hand Side in 2001 and Danzig 777: I Luciferi in 2002, before Castillo left to join Queens of the Stone Age. He was replaced for two shows in October 2002 by Halfcocked's Charlee Johnson, and later by Type O Negative's Johnny Kelly, before Bevan Davies took over the following summer. The rest of the lineup also changed in 2003 – first it was announced that Youth had left the band, with Tommy Victor returning in his place; and a few weeks later it was added that Pyro had been replaced by former Nothingface bassist Jerry Montano. This lineup of the band released Circle of Snakes in 2004.

After touring in promotion of Circle of Snakes, Danzig went through more changes in personnel. First, Davies was replaced by the returning Kelly in January 2005. Victor parted ways with the group in June, with Joe Fraulob announced as his replacement a few months later. Fraulob himself left only a year later, with Type O Negative's Kenny Hickey taking over in September 2006. Steve Zing (real name Steven Grecco), Danzig's former bandmate in Samhain, also took over from Montano the following month. Youth returned to replace Hickey for a touring cycle the following year, before Victor returned for the group's 20th anniversary tour in 2008. The group has since released an additional three studio albums – Deth Red Sabaoth in 2010, Skeletons in 2015 and Black Laden Crown in 2017.

Members

Current

Former

Timeline

Lineups

References

External links
Danzig official website

Danzig